Tour de Brunei is a men's stage race cycle race which takes place in Brunei and was rated by the UCI as 2.2 and forms part of the UCI Asia Tour. The cycling event has been held in 2011 and 2012, but was cancelled each year since 2013.

Overall winners

References

Sports competitions in Brunei
UCI Asia Tour races